Callian is a commune in the Var department in the Provence-Alpes-Côte d'Azur region in southeastern France.

Twin towns
Callian is twinned with:

  Calliano, Piedmont, Italy
  Calliano, Trentino, Italy

See also
Communes of the Var department
Official Website of the Village of Callian (French)

References

Communes of Var (department)